HKN may refer to:

Transportation 
 Haranya Kheri railway station, in India
 Hawksburn railway station, in Melbourne, Australia
 Hoskins Airport, in Papua New Guinea
 Hucknall station, in England
 Hankou railway station, China Railway telegraph code HKN

Other uses 
 HKN, Inc., an American oil and gas company
 Eta Kappa Nu, an engineering honour society of the IEEE
 H. K. Narayana (born 1934), Indian composer